White Top is a knob and spur of Cheat Mountain in southeastern Randolph County, West Virginia, USA. While White Top was originally crossed by the Staunton-Parkersburg Turnpike, modern-day U.S. Route 250 skirts the base of the knob beside Shavers Fork to the north and east.

Cheat Summit Fort (Fort Milroy)

White Top is perhaps best known as the site of the highest Union camp during the American Civil War. In guarding the Turnpike, Fort Milroy helped to guard entrance to the Tygart Valley River valley to the west.

Construction on Fort Milroy (named for Union Brigadier General Robert H. Milroy) began on July 16, 1861.  Due to its high elevation, the Union Army faced a number of winter-related miseries.  Snow was first reported for the year on August 13.  Horses froze to death in mid-September.  These issues, along with some success in driving Confederate forces from the area led to the abandonment of the fort in April 1862.  One Indiana soldier is quoted as having said this of their departure: "With what a light step all started. Soon on the road turning at the brow of the hill, the fourteenth took what I fondly hope is their last look at Cheat Mountain."

The Cheat Summit Fort site was listed on the National Register of Historic Places in 1990.

Fort Milroy Cemetery
A cemetery for those who died at Fort Milroy was built just south of the fort.  All bodies were exhumed from the site after the Civil War ended with many being reinterred at West Virginia National Cemetery in Grafton.  Depressions from the graves are still visible today.

Cheat Mountain salamander

White Top is also known as the first location where the Cheat Mountain Salamander was identified.  This small vertebrate species was identified in 1935 by M. Graham Netting and Leonard Llewellyn.  The salamander is found only on Cheat Mountain and adjacent mountains in the West Virginia highlands.

References

See also
Battle of Camp Allegheny – Confederate base several miles east on Allegheny Mountain

Archaeological sites on the National Register of Historic Places in West Virginia
Mountains of Randolph County, West Virginia
Mountains of West Virginia
Monongahela National Forest
Allegheny Mountains
Conflict sites on the National Register of Historic Places in West Virginia
Randolph County, West Virginia in the American Civil War
National Register of Historic Places in Randolph County, West Virginia
American Civil War sites in West Virginia